The NCC Open was a golf tournament on the Swedish Golf Tour from 1984 and on the Challenge Tour from 1990. It was last played in 2001 and always held at Söderåsen Golf Club near Söderåsen National Park outside Helsingborg, Sweden.

Winners

Notes

References

External links
Coverage on the Challenge Tour's official site

Former Challenge Tour events
Swedish Golf Tour events
Golf tournaments in Sweden
Recurring sporting  events established in 1984
Recurring sporting events disestablished in 2001
1984 establishments in Sweden
2001 disestablishments in Sweden